Sam Houston High School, also known as Houston High School, is a public high school located in eastern San Antonio, Texas, United States, and classified as a 4A school by the UIL. This school is one of twelve schools in the San Antonio Independent School District. In 2015, the school was rated "Met Standard" by the Texas Education Agency.

Athletics
The Sam Houston Hurricanes compete in the following sports:
Baseball
Basketball
Cross Country
Football
Golf
Soccer
Softball
Swimming and Ding
Tennis
Track and Field
Volleyball

Shooting
On September 11, 1990, three high-school students were shot and wounded in what was believed to be a gang-related confrontation on the school grounds. Three other students were arrested shortly afterwards. Witnesses told police a group of students had gathered on the patio when shots were fired into the group. 17-year-old John Campbell was wounded in the right foot, 18-year-old Larry Johnson was wounded in the right thigh and calf, and a 16-year-old boy received a chest wound. The wounded students were all listed in stable conditions at various San Antonio hospitals. Police said they recovered a large-caliber pistol from the crime scene. Eighteen-year-old Kenneth Wolford, plus two other male students, were arrested and charged for the shooting. No serious incidents of violence at the school had occurred previously, although a cache of weapons had been found inside a school locker the week prior to the shooting and security was increased at the school as a result.

References

External links
 

High schools in San Antonio
San Antonio Independent School District high schools